Enos is a figure in the Book of Mormon who is a son or grandson of Jacob, a Nephite prophet and author of the Book of Enos. According to the Book of Mormon, Enos lived sometime in the 6th century BC.

Family

Or, alternately:

Nephite record keeping

According to the Book of Mormon narrative, Enos was third in the series of record keepers who maintained the record of the Nephites, a set of metal plates containing the spiritual and secular history of the Nephites. Enos was given charge of the record by his father, Jacob, son of Lehi and brother of Nephi. Both Nephi and Jacob had kept the record previously, recording First and Second Nephi and the Book of Jacob, respectively. Enos's contribution to the record, the Book of Enos, consists of a single chapter, told in the first person, describing his own conversion and subsequent ministry.

Following Enos's death the record of the Nephites was kept by Enos' son, Jarom.

Early life

No details of Enos's early life are given except that he had been taught by his father "in the nurture and the admonition of the Lord". Because Enos begins his story by telling of his "wrestle which [he] had before God, before [he] received a remission of [his] sins", it is sometimes assumed that he had been rebellious prior to that time. President Spencer W. Kimball said, "Like many sons of good families he strayed. How heinous were his sins I do not know, but they must have been grievous".

Conversion

Enos relates that, while hunting beasts in the forest, his "soul hungered" and he knelt and prayed for forgiveness. His prayer continued throughout the day and into the night, until he heard a voice, saying: "Enos, thy sins are forgiven thee, and thou shalt be blessed".

Having obtained personal forgiveness, Enos continued to pray on behalf of his people, the Nephites, and was given to understand that they would be blessed "according to their diligence in keeping [God's] commandments". His faith being strengthened by these revelations, he began to pray for "[his] brethren, the Lamanites", who had become estranged from the Nephites and were now their enemies. He received a promise that the record of the Nephites would be preserved and would be brought forth to the Lamanites in the Lord's "due time".

Ministry

Following this powerful conversion, Enos went forth prophesying to the Nephites. He testifies that the Nephites tried to "restore the Lamanites to the true faith in God", but that they were unsuccessful. He describes the Lamanites as having become "wild, and ferocious, and a blood-thirsty people". The Nephites, in contrast, are industrious at farming and herding, but Enos makes it clear that they were "stiffnecked" and continual preaching of the word of God was necessary to keep them from "going down speedily to destruction".

At the close of his record, Enos testifies of his unshakeable faith in his Redeemer.

Possible origin of the name 
The name "Enos" or "Enosh" (Hebrew: אֱנוֹשׁ) appears in at least two books of the Bible. It means "mortal man", in Hebrew, which Hugh Nibley remarks as being similar in definition to the name "Adam".

In the Book of Genesis, Enos is the first son of Seth who figures in the Generations of Adam, and consequently referred to within the genealogies of Chronicles, and the genealogy of Jesus in the Gospel of Luke.

See also
 Historicity of the Book of Mormon

References

Further reading

External links 
Enos Prays Mightily (Book of Mormon Video)

Book of Mormon prophets